Blepharandra is a genus in the Malpighiaceae, a family of about 75 genera of flowering plants in the order Malpighiales. Blepharandra comprises 6 species of trees and shrubs native to sandy savannas and scrub forests of Guyana, southern Venezuela, and Amazonian Brazil.

External links
Malpighiaceae Malpighiaceae - description, taxonomy, phylogeny, and nomenclature
Blepharandra

Malpighiaceae
Malpighiaceae genera